Various television networks, newspapers, and radio stations operate within Rwanda. These forms of mass media serve the Rwandan community by disseminating necessary information among the general public. They are regulated by the self-regulatory body.

Media industry profiles

Newspapers
The New Times is the largest English-language and the oldest in Rwanda. It also owns a newspaper joint in the local language Kinyarwanda, called Izuba Rirashe. The newspaper has been criticized for being "too servile" to the ruling party of Rwanda, and being "excessively optimistic". As such, competitors in the English-language newspaper industry have sprung up in recent years, with the formation of another large-scale English newspaper News of Rwanda in 2011. Other minor newspapers have also been created to counter the pro-establishment role of the newspaper, such as The Rwandan, Rwanda Eye and Business Daily.

Several newspaper publishers also provide Kinyarwanda-language newspapers, including both News of Rwanda and The Rwandan. In June 2018, News of Rwanda closed.

Television
The Rwandan television industry is made 12 TV stations. 84% of TV stations owned by private(10 out of 12)  While 8% and 8% are owned by public and Religious organisations respectively. The state-owned Rwandan Broadcasting Agency runs the TV station Rwanda Television (RTV).

Radio

Likewise, radio in Rwanda is mainly conducted through a subsidiary of the RBA, Radio Rwanda. The radio station offers Kinyarwanda, French, Kiswahili and English language services in FM 100.7. As such, it is used to complement other media which mainly provided services in English and Kinyarwanda, the two popular languages in Rwanda. Due to the recent economic development in Rwanda, radio has taken less precedence among other forms of communication, and the government has also focused on improving the television industry in Rwanda.

Book publishers
A major share of the market is controlled by nine indigenous publishers, among which four have opened bookshops in the country. Before the genocide against the Tutsi, there were no publishing houses in Rwanda. The situation improved after the incident, with the first indigenous publisher established in the country, Bakame Editions. Since the turn of the century, major publishers from all across the world such as Oxford University Press and Macmillan Publishers have begun making inroads into the local publishing industry. However, the establishment of publishing houses locally and from abroad has not instituted a healthy reading culture in Rwanda, and local publishers have decried the fact that the younger generation does not often participate in this pastime. Despite the boom in the local publishing industry, a similar spell of growth has yet to be seen in the commercial trading of books. Bookstores remain a rare sight in Rwanda, and the first library in the country was established in 2012 in Kigali.

Legal regulation of media
A statutory authority has been established according to the Constitution of Rwanda, called The Media High Council. The official mission of the council is to guide the industry in reflecting trends of globalization, to equip the industry with the skills required, and to conduct necessary research to improve the sector. The legal responsibilities of the council is further elaborated in section Nº03/2013 of the law. Freedom of the press in Rwanda is enshrined within Article 34 of the Constitution of Rwanda:

"Freedom of the press and freedom of information are recognized and guaranteed by the State.

Freedom of speech and freedom of information shall not prejudice public order and good morals, the right of every citizen to honour, good reputation and the privacy of personal and family life. It is also guaranteed so long as it does not prejudice the protection of the youth and minors.

The conditions for exercising such freedoms are determined by law.

There is hereby established an independent institution known as the "High Council of the Press ».

The law shall determine its functions, organization and operation."

As such, it is imperative for the government and the people to recognize the freedom of the press in Rwanda, as stated in the Constitution of Rwanda. The media should be free from all government intervention, and is only governed by the autonomous Media High Council.

Freedom of the press
According to Freedom House, Rwanda's Press Freedom score was 79 in 2015 (0 represents the best score, 100 represents the worst score), and was considered "not free" by its standards. Throughout the years, journalists have faced continuous harassment from the government, including arbitrary arrests and threats. Journalists also practice self-censorship for fear of government retaliation, dealing a severe blow to Rwanda's freedom of the press. The government also actively participated in potentially unconstitutional acts of interfering with the media, by banning BBC's Kinyarwanda service in Rwanda due to the airing of a controversial documentary.

See also

 Telecommunications in Rwanda
Press Freedom
Constitution of Rwanda
Media of Africa

References

Bibliography
 

 
Rwanda articles by importance
Rwanda articles by quality
Rwanda
Rwanda